Pagaivanuku Arulvaai is an upcoming Indian Tamil-language gangster film written and directed by Anis of Thirumanam Enum Nikkah fame,  and produced by Kishore under the banner of 4 Monkeys Studio. The film stars M. Sasikumar, Vani Bhojan and Bindhu Madhavi. The film is based on William Shakespeare's play Macbeth.

Cast

Production 
Principal photography began on 14 December 2020.

Home Media 
The Satellite Rights of the film were acquired by Star Vijay and the Streaming Rights of the film were acquired by Hotstar.

References

External links 
 

Indian films based on plays
Macbeth

Upcoming Tamil-language films